Ronald Stuart Napier (born 23 October 1935) is a South African former first-class cricketer.

Born at Cape Town in October 1935, Napier was educated in England at Eton College, before going up to Trinity College, Oxford. While studying at Oxford, he made a single appearance in first-class cricket for Oxford University against Sussex at Oxford in 1956. Returning to South Africa after graduating, he has formerly held the positions of chairman of The Fire Protection Association and has served on the board of Business Against Crime, in addition to being a company director.

References

External links

1935 births
Living people
People from Cape Town
People educated at Eton College
Alumni of Trinity College, Oxford
South African cricketers
Oxford University cricketers
South African businesspeople